Proesochtha is a genus of moth in the family Lecithoceridae. It contains the species Proesochtha loxosa, which is found in China (Fujian).

References

Natural History Museum Lepidoptera genus database

Lecithoceridae